Kolmogorov's theorem is any of several different results by Andrey Kolmogorov:

In statistics
 Kolmogorov–Smirnov test
In probability theory
 Hahn–Kolmogorov theorem
 Kolmogorov extension theorem
 Kolmogorov continuity theorem
 Kolmogorov's three-series theorem
 Kolmogorov's zero–one law
 Chapman–Kolmogorov equations
 Kolmogorov inequalities
 Kolmogorov's inequality
 Kolmogorov's inequality for positive submartingales
In functional analysis
Landau–Kolmogorov inequality
 Fréchet–Kolmogorov theorem